Holland is an unincorporated community in Lancaster County, Nebraska, United States.

History
Holland was founded in about 1886. A large share of the early settlers being natives of Holland caused the name to be selected.

There was an ice cream parlor operated by two unmarried sisters. Holland was busier than Panama and Pella. Holland has a street light as well. There was also a Dutch Reformed Church in Holland.

References

Unincorporated communities in Lancaster County, Nebraska
Unincorporated communities in Nebraska